The Rastriya Janata Party, Nepal, abbr. RJPN (translation: National People's Party, Nepal) was the fourth-largest political party in Nepal after the Nepali Congress, the Nepal Communist Party and the Samajbadi Party, Nepal. It was formed on 21 April 2017 after the merger of Tarai Madhes Loktantrik Party, led by the Mahantha Thakur, Terai Madhes Sadbhawana Party, led by the Mahendra Raya Yadav, Sadbhavana Party, led by the Rajendra Mahato, Nepal Sadbhawana Party, led by the Anil Kumar Jha, Madhesi Jana Adhikar Forum (Republican), led by Rajkishor Yadav and Rastriya Madhesh Samajwadi Party, led by Sharat Singh Bhandari. The party was founded with the ideology of democratic system.

On 22 April 2020, the party merged with Samajbadi Party, Nepal to form Janata Samajbadi Party, Nepal.

History 
On 14 April 2017, six of the seven constituents of the United Democratic Madhesi Front agreed in principle to merge in a bid to form a strong force representing the Terai region. The party was formed on 21 April, as the Rastriya Janata Party and Mahanta Thakur was announced as its chairperson. The party on 26 April, changed its name to Rastriya Janata Party Nepal after it clashed with another party bearing the name Rastriya Janata Party, which later merged with Nepal Loktantrik Forum, registered in the Election Commission. The party registered at the Election Commission on 7 July 2017.

Elections, 2017–2020 
The party had initially decided to not participate in the third phase of the local elections but changed their decision later. The party had the second highest candidates elected in Province No. 2 with 1,112 candidates being elected. The party won 25 mayoral posts, including a win in Janakpur.

Ahead of the legislative and provincial elections, RJPN formed an alliance with Upendra Yadav led Federal Socialist Forum, Nepal. The party won 17 seats in the House of Representatives and finished with the fourth highest vote count in proportional representation. The party won in key areas of their home province in Province No. 2 winning 13 mayoral seats f 67 municipalities in province which is nearly 19% making it the 3rd largest party at local level in province.

The party won 25 seats in the provincial assembly for Province No. 2, 1 seat in Lumbini Province and 2 seats in Sudurpashchim. Following the election, RJPN and Federal Socialist Forum announced that they would form a coalition government in Province No. 2, with FSFN getting the post of Chief Minister and RJPN getting the post of Speaker.

The party won 2 seats in the National Assembly elections, both candidates were elected unopposed from Province No. 2. On 20 April 2018, disgruntled leaders led by Ashok Kumar Yadav broke away from the party and formed Rastriya Janata Party (Democratic).

The party merged with Samajbadi Party, Nepal on 22 April 2020.

Breakaway factions

List of breakaway parties

Electoral performance

Presence in various provinces

Leadership

Presidium 
The Rastriya Janata Party Nepal was led by a six member presidium who would share the chairmanship of the party on a rotational basis.

Mahantha Thakur
Mahendra Raya Yadav
Rajendra Mahato
Anil Kumar Jha
Raj Kishor Yadav
Sharat Singh Bhandari

General Secretary 

Rajeev Jha
Jitendra Prasad Sonal
Jangi Lal Raya
Jitendra Singh Yadav
Keshav Kumar Jha
Manish Kumar Suman

Senior leader 

 Hridayesh Tripathi

Vice president 

 Brikhesh Chandra Lal
 Laxman Lal Karna

References

 
2017 establishments in Nepal
2020 disestablishments in Nepal
Political parties established in 2017
Political parties disestablished in 2020
Federalist parties in Nepal
Defunct socialist parties in Nepal